Endless Shame is an electronic band from the South of Sweden. The music is inspired by various types of electronic music and alternative rock and pop.

Endless Shame started in the 90s but it wasn't until 2007 that they released their debut album Price of Devotion on the Swedish record label ”K-Town Records”. The album got positive reviews and was nominated for ”best album of the year” in the category ”Synth” at ”Manifestgalan” in Sweden.
In November 2009 the band released their second album Unspoken Words on the American record label A Different Drum. The album got a great deal of attention amongst fans of synth pop, EBM and electro. The single ”Pure” went on to become a dance hit at clubs playing electronic music.
In 2010, Endless Shame decided to work together with EK Product in Italy for the release of their third album Generation Blind. Along with the album a single "Halo" was released and the band recorded a music video for the song "The Reaper" in Naples, Italy in October 2010.

Discography
Price Of Devotion CD (2007)
Rebel Girl CDM (2008)
Pure CDM (2009)
Unspoken Words CD (2009)
Halo CDM (2009)
Generation Blind CD (2011)
Elevator CD (2012)

External links
Endless Shame.com (official website)
Facebook (Facebook site)
Myspace (Myspace site)

EK Product (official website record label)

Musical groups established in 1993
Swedish electronic music groups
Swedish new wave musical groups
1993 establishments in Sweden